John Sykes (born 2 November 1950) is an English former professional footballer who played as a forward. He made appearances in the English football league with Bradford Park Avenue and Wrexham before emigrating to Australia.

References

1950 births
Living people
English footballers
English Football League players
Bradford (Park Avenue) A.F.C. players
Wrexham A.F.C. players
Footballers from Huddersfield
English emigrants to Australia
Association football inside forwards